The Dante Alighieri Society (Italian: Società Dante Alighieri) is a society that promotes Italian culture and language around the world. Today this society is present in more than 60 countries.

It was formed in Italy in July 1889. The society was named after Dante Alighieri (1265–1321), a pre-Italian Renaissance poet from Florence and the author of the Divine Comedy. Dante is considered the father of the Italian language.

In October 1948 the society was restructured at a meeting in Venice to give total autonomy to all chapters of the Dante Society so that each could conduct its activities independently, under the direction of its own elected officers, in a manner that best suited local needs, preferences, and capacities while adhering to the Society's basic principles.

The cultural role of Dante Alighieri 
The sole purpose of the Dante Alighieri Society is to "promote the study of the Italian language and culture throughout the world...a purpose independent of political ideologies, national or ethnic origins or religious beliefs, and that the Society is the free association of people – not just Italians – but all people everywhere who are united by their love for the Italian languages and culture and the spirit of universal humanism that these represent."

The society operates throughout the world, with branches from Australia to the United States. Many societies offer language courses, ranging from tourist and beginner's Italian to advanced literature, in addition to their cultural activities.

In 2005, the Dante Alighieri Society (along with the Alliance française, British Council, Goethe-Institut, Instituto Camões, and Instituto Cervantes) was awarded the Prince of Asturias Award for Communications and Humanities.

See also
 Istituto Italiano di Cultura

References

Further reading

External links 

 Official website (in Italian)
 Global Dante society

Cultural promotion organizations
Dante Alighieri
1889 establishments in Italy
Italian culture
Learned societies of Italy